Seri Jahan (also Romanized as Serī Jahan and Sarī Jahan; also known as Sar Jahan, Sīrījahan, Sīrī Jahan, and Sīr Jahand) is a village in Garmsir Rural District, in the Central District of Ardestan County, Isfahan Province, Iran. At the 2006 census, its population was 53, in 14 families.

References 

Populated places in Ardestan County